Mohammad Sahan bin Mumtazali (born 5 March 1986) is a footballer from Brunei who played as a goalkeeper.

He made his first appearance for the Brunei national football team in 2009.

References 

1986 births
Living people
Bruneian footballers
Brunei international footballers
Association football goalkeepers